Keijo Kalevi Huotari (15 June 1924, Nuijamaa – 8 March 1975) was a Finnish farmer and politician. He was a Member of the Parliament of Finland, representing the Finnish Rural Party (SMP) from 1970 to 1972 and the Finnish People's Unity Party (SKYP) from 1972 until his death in 1975.

References

1924 births
1975 deaths
People from Lappeenranta
Finnish Rural Party politicians
Finnish People's Unity Party politicians
Members of the Parliament of Finland (1970–72)
Members of the Parliament of Finland (1972–75)
Place of death missing